is one of five national colleges of Maritime Technology in Japan. This college trains  deck or engineer licensed mariners.

Maritime colleges in Japan
Universities and colleges in Ehime Prefecture
Educational institutions established in 1901
1901 establishments in Japan